Acrobasis indigenella, the leaf crumpler, is a species of snout moth in the genus Acrobasis. It was described by Philipp Christoph Zeller in 1848, and is known from eastern North America.

The wingspan is 15–20 mm. There are two generations per year in the south-eastern United States.

The larvae feed on Malus pumila, Cydonia oblonga, Prunus, Cotoneaster, Pyracantha, Crataegus and Eriobotrya japonica. The larvae construct tubes that are attached to twigs of their host plant. These tubes are expanded with silk and leaf fragments while the larvae grow. The larvae first feed on developing leaves near the tube, but leave their shelters when all of these leaves are eaten. Pupation takes place within the tube. They are greyish green with purplish markings above and pale greyish green on the underside. The head is pale reddish brown. The reach a length of 14.5-17.5 mm. The species overwinters in the larval stage.

References

Moths described in 1848
Acrobasis
Moths of North America